Big Kahuna Burger is a fictional chain of Hawaiian-themed fast food restaurants that has appeared in films by Quentin Tarantino and Robert Rodriguez, including Death Proof, Four Rooms, Pulp Fiction, Reservoir Dogs and From Dusk till Dawn. The packaging was created by Tarantino's old friend Jerry Martinez. The restaurant features most prominently in Pulp Fiction, where Jules Winnfield eats the sandwich to intimidate the main target of a contract killing he has been ordered to carry out and remarks, "This is a tasty burger!" 

In Pulp Fiction, the burger appears to be a typical American beef burger, with cheese, lettuce and tomato on a hamburger bun. Multiple real restaurants have featured a "Big Kahuna Burger" on their menus, including Inskip Grill located in Tarantino's hometown of Knoxville, Tennessee.

Appearances

See also

 Los Pollos Hermanos

References

Fictional objects
Fictional restaurants
Quentin Tarantino